Saint Guthlac of Crowland (674 – 3 April 714 CE) was a Christian hermit and saint from Lincolnshire in England. He is particularly venerated in the Fens of eastern England.

Life

Guthlac was the son of Penwalh or Penwald, a noble of the English kingdom of Mercia, and his wife Tette. His sister is also venerated as St Pega. As a young man, Guthlac fought in the army of Æthelred of Mercia. He subsequently became a monk at Repton Monastery in Derbyshire at the age of 24, under the abbess there, Repton being a double monastery. Two years later he sought to live the life of a hermit, and moved out to the island of Croyland, now called Crowland, on St Bartholomew's Day, 699. His early biographer Felix asserts that Guthlac could understand the strimulentes loquelas ("sibilant speech") of British-speaking demons who haunted him there, only because Guthlac had spent some time in exile among Celtic Britons.

Guthlac built a small oratory and cells in the side of a plundered barrow on the island. There he lived until his death on 11 April 714. Felix, writing within living memory of Guthlac, described his hermit's life:

Guthlac suffered from ague and marsh fever.

Guthlac's pious and holy ascetic life became the talk of the land, and many people visited Guthlac during his life to seek spiritual guidance from him. He gave sanctuary to Æthelbald, future king of Mercia, who was fleeing from his cousin Ceolred. Guthlac predicted that Æthelbald would become king, and Æthelbald promised to build him an abbey if his prophecy became true. Æthelbald indeed became king, and even though Guthlac had died two years before, he kept his word and started to build Crowland Abbey on St Bartholomew's Day, 716. Guthlac's feast day is celebrated on 11 April.

The 8th-century Latin Vita sancti Guthlaci, written by Felix, describes the entry of the demons into Guthlac's cell:

Felix records Guthlac's foreknowledge of his own death, conversing with angels in his last days. At the moment of death a sweet nectar-like odour emanated from his mouth, as his soul departed from his body in a beam of light while the angels sang. Guthlac had requested a lead coffin and linen winding sheet from Ecgburh, Abbess of Repton Abbey, so that his funeral rites could be performed by his sister Pega. Arriving the day after his death, she found the island of Crowland filled with the scent of ambrosia. She buried the body on the mound after three days of prayer. A year later Pega had a divine calling to move the tomb and relics to a nearby chapel: Guthlac's body is said to have been discovered uncorrupted, his shroud shining with light. Subsequently Guthlac appeared in a miraculous vision to Æthelbald, prophesying he would be future King of Mercia. The cult of Guthlac continued amongst a monastic community at Crowland, with the eventual foundation of Crowland Abbey as a Benedictine Order in 971. A series of fires at the abbey mean that few records survive from before the 12th century. It is known that in 1136 the remains of Guthlac were moved once more, and that finally in 1196 his shrine was placed above the main altar.

Other accounts
A short Old English sermon (Vercelli XXIII) and a longer prose translation into Old English are both based on Felix's Vita. There are also two poems in Old English known as Guthlac A and Guthlac B, part of the tenth century Exeter Book, the oldest surviving collection of English poetry. The relationship of Guthlac A to Felix's Vita is debated, but Guthlac B is based on Felix's account of the saint's death.

The story of Guthlac is told pictorially in the Guthlac Roll, a set of detailed illustrations of the early 13th century. This is held in the British Library, with copies on display in Crowland Abbey.

Another account, also dating from after the Norman Conquest, was included in the Ecclesiastical History of Orderic Vitalis, which like the Guthlac Roll was commissioned by the Abbot of Crowland Abbey. At a time when it was being challenged by the crown, the Abbey relied significantly on the cult of Guthlac, which made it a place of pilgrimage and healing. That is reflected in a shift in the emphasis from the earlier accounts of Felix and others. The post-conquest accounts portray him as a defender of the church rather than a saintly ascetic; instead of dwelling in an ancient burial mound, they depict Guthlac overseeing the building of a brick and stone chapel on the site of the abbey.

The Yorkshire village of Golcar on the outskirts of Huddersfield is named after St Guthlac, who preached in the area during the 8th century. The name of the village is recorded in the Domesday Book as Goullakarres.

It has been proposed that Shakespeare drew on a lost play based on St Guthlac when writing The Tempest.

For a discussion of the name “Guthlac” see Paul Cavill's essay "The naming of Guthlac".

St Guthlac Fellowship

Formed in 1987, St Guthlac Fellowship is a group of churches sharing a dedication to St Guthlac. Its fellows are these:
Crowland Abbey, Crowland, Lincolnshire
St Guthlac's Church, Astwick, Bedfordshire
All Saints' Parish Church, Branston, Lincolnshire
Our Lady and St Guthlac Roman Catholic church, Deeping St James, Lincolnshire
St Guthlac's Church, Little Cowarne, Herefordshire
St Guthlac's Church, Market Deeping, Lincolnshire
St Guthlac's Church, Fishtoft, Lincolnshire
St Guthlac's Church, Knighton, Leicestershire
St Guthlac's Church, Little Ponton, Lincolnshire
St Guthlac's Church, Passenham, Northamptonshire
St Guthlac's Church, Stathern, Leicestershire
St Guthlac's Church, Branston, Leicestershire

Gallery

See also
St Guthlac's Priory, Hereford

References

Further reading

Primary sources
Felix, Vita Sancti Guthlaci, early 8th-century Latin prose Life of St Guthlac:
Colgrave, Bertram (ed. and tr.). Felix's Life of Saint Guthlac. Cambridge: Cambridge University Press, 1956
Old English prose translation/adaptation (late 9th or early 10th century) of the Life of St Guthlac by Felix:
Gonser, P. (ed.). Das angelsächsische Prosa-Leben des heiligen Guthlac. Anglistische Forschungen 27. Heidelberg, 1909
Goodwin, Charles Wycliffe (ed. and tr.) The Anglo-Saxon Version of the Life of St. Guthlac, Hermit of Crowland. London, 1848
Two chapters from the Old English prose adaptation as incorporated into Vercelli Homily 23
Scragg, D. G. (ed.) The Vercelli Homilies and Related Texts. EETS 300. Oxford: University Press, 1992
Guthlac A and Guthlac B (Old English poems):
Roberts, Jane (ed.) The Guthlac Poems of the Exeter Book. Oxford: Clarendon Press, 1979
Krapp, G. and E. V. K. Dobbie (eds.). The Exeter Book. Anglo-Saxon Poetic Records 3. 1936. 49–88
Bradley, S. A. J. (tr.) Anglo-Saxon Poetry. London: Everyman, 1982

Harley Roll or Guthlac Roll (BL, Harleian Roll Y.6)
Warner, G. F. (ed.). The Guthlac Roll. Roxburghe Club, 1928. 25 plates in facsimile

Secondary sources

Cubitt, Catherine. "Memory and narrative in the cult of early Anglo-Saxon saints" The Uses of the Past in the Early Middle Ages, ed. Matthew Innes    
Olsen, Alexandra. Guthlac of Croyland: a Study of Heroic Hagiography. Washington, 1981
Powell, Stephen D. "The Journey Forth: Elegiac Consolation in Guthlac B." English Studies 79 (1998), pp. 489–500
Roberts, Jane. "The Old English Prose Translation of Felix’s Vita Sancti Guthlaci" Studies in Earlier Old English Prose: Sixteen Original Contributions, ed. Paul E. Szarmach. Albany, 1986, pp. 363–379
Roberts, Jane. "An inventory of early Guthlac materials" Mediaeval Studies 32 (1970), pp. 193–233
Sharma, Manish. "A Reconsideration of Guthlac A: The Extremes of Saintliness". Journal of English and Germanic Philology 101 (2002), pp. 185–200
Shook, Laurence K. "The Burial Mound in 'Guthlac A'". Modern Philology 58, 1 (August 1960), pp. 1–10
Soon Ai, Low. "Mental Culturation in Guthlac B". Neophilologus 81 (1997), pp. 625–636
Roberts, Jane. "Guthlac of Crowland, a Saint for Middle England." Fursey Occasional Paper 3. Norwich: Fursey Pilgrims, 2009. 1–36

External links

The Guthlac Roll, British Library online exhibition
The Guthlac Roll, full online facsimile
St Guthlac's Cross, Grade II listed site, English Heritage
CatholicSaints.Info

673 births
714 deaths
7th-century English people
8th-century English people
English hermits
Eastern Orthodox monks
East Anglian saints
Miracle workers
8th-century Christian saints
Incorrupt saints
People from Lincolnshire
Angelic visionaries